Chynowa  is a village in the administrative district of Gmina Przygodzice, within Ostrów Wielkopolski County, Greater Poland Voivodeship, in west-central Poland.

The village has a population of 1,100.

References

Chynowa